Nashimoto may refer to:

 Nashimoto-no-miya, a branch of the Japanese imperial family

People with the surname
, a member of the Japanese imperial family
, Japanese show business reporter

Japanese-language surnames